Innokenty Mikhailovich Smoktunovsky (born Smoktunovich, 28 March 19253 August 1994) was a Soviet and Russian stage and film actor. He was named a People's Artist of the USSR in 1974 and a Hero of Socialist Labour in 1990.

Early life

Smoktunovsky was born in a Siberian village in a peasant family of Belarusian ethnicity. It was once rumored that he came from a Polish family, even nobility, but the actor himself denied these theories by stating his family was Belarusian and not of nobility. He served in the Red Army during World War II and fought in Kursk, Dnipro and Kyiv battles. In 1946, he joined a theatre in Krasnoyarsk, later moving to Moscow. In 1957, he was invited by Georgy Tovstonogov to join the Bolshoi Drama Theatre of Leningrad, where he stunned the public with his dramatic interpretation of Prince Myshkin in Dostoevsky's The Idiot. One of his best roles was the title role in Aleksey Konstantinovich Tolstoy's Tsar Fyodor Ioannovich (Maly Theatre, 1973).

Film career 

His career in film was launched by Mikhail Romm's movie Nine Days in One Year (1962). In 1964, he was cast in the role of Hamlet in Grigori Kozintsev's celebrated screen version of Shakespeare's play, which won him praise from Laurence Olivier as well as the Lenin Prize. Many English critics even ranked the Hamlet of Smoktunovsky above the one played by Olivier, at a time when Olivier's was still considered definitive. Smoktunovsky created an integral heroic portrait, which blended together what seemed incompatible before: manly simplicity and exquisite aristocratism, kindness and caustic sarcasm, a derisive mindset and self-sacrifice.

Smoktunovsky became known to wider audiences as Yuri Detochkin in Eldar Ryazanov's detective satire Beware of the Car (1966), which revealed the actor's outstanding comic gifts. Later, he played Pyotr Ilyich Tchaikovsky in Tchaikovsky (1969), Uncle Vanya in Andrei Konchalovsky's screen version of Chekhov's play (1970), the Narrator in Andrei Tarkovsky's Mirror (1975), an old man in Anatoly Efros's On Thursday and Never Again (1977), and Salieri in Mikhail Schweitzer's Little Tragedies (1979) based on Alexander Pushkin's plays.

In 1990, Smoktunovsky won the Nika Award in the category Best Actor. He died on 3 August 1994, at a sanatorium, aged 69. The minor planet 4926 Smoktunovskij was named after him.

Filmography

 Murder on Dante Street (1956) as Young fascist
 Soldiers (1956) as Lieutenant Farber
 Close to Us (1958) as Andrei
 Letter Never Sent (1960) as Konstantin Fyodorovich Sabinin
 Until Next Spring (1960) as Aleksei Nikolayevich Ruchyev
 After the Wedding (1962) as Narrator's voice
 Nine Days in One Year (1962) as Ilya Kulikov
 Mozart and Salieri (1962) as Wolfgang Amadeus Mozart
 Hamlet (1964) as Prince Hamlet
 On the Same Planet (1965) as Vladimir Lenin
 Beware of the Car (1966) as Yuri Detochkin
 Degree of Risk (1968) as Aleksandr Kirillov
 The Living Corpse (1968) as Ivan Petrovich
 Crime and Punishment (1969) as Porfiry Petrovich
 Tchaikovsky (1970) as Pyotr Ilyich Tchaikovsky
 Uncle Vanya (1970) as Ivan Petrovich Voinitsky ("Uncle Vanya")
 Ilf and Petrov Rode a Tram (1972) as Tram passenger
 Taming of the Fire (1972) as Konstantin Tsiolkovsky
 Moscow-Cassiopeia (1973) as I.O.O.
 The Heron and the Crane (1974) as Narrator's voice
 Daughters-Mothers (1974) as Vadim Antonovich Vasilyev
 A Lover's Romance (1974) as Trumpeter
 Teens in the Universe (1974) as I.O.O.
 Take Aim (1974) as Franklin D. Roosevelt
 Mirror (1975) as adult Aleksei's voice
 The Captivating Star of Happiness (1975) as Ivan Bogdanovich Zeidler
 They Fought for Their Country (1975) as Surgeon
 Twenty Days Without War (1976) as Vyacheslav's voice (played by Nikolai Grinko)
 Trust (1976) as Nikolay Bobrikov
 The Princess on a Pea (1977) as King
 The Steppe (1977) as Moisei Moiseyevich
 On Thursday and Never Again (1977) as Ivan Modestovich
 The Barrier (1979) as Antony Manev
 Moscow Does Not Believe in Tears (1979) as himself (cameo appearance)
 Little Tragedies (1979) as Antonio Salieri and Old Baron
 The Queen of Spades (1982) as Chekalinsky
 Dead Souls (1984) as Plyushkin
 Primary Russia (1985) as Emperor Justinian I
 The Last Road (1986) as Jacob van Heeckeren tot Enghuizen
 The Twentieth Century Approaches (1986) as Lord Thomas Bellinger
 Dark Eyes (1987) as Modest Petrovich
 Gardes-Marines, Ahead! (1987) as André-Hercule de Fleury
 First Encounter - Last Encounter (1987) as Counterintelligence colonel
 Mother (1989) as Governor
 A Trap for Lonely Man (1990) as Merlouche the artist
 Genius (1991) as Mafia leader Gilya
 Dandelion Wine (1997) as Colonel Freeley (voiced by Sergey Bezrukov; released posthumously)

References

External links

 
Smoktunovsky's biography in The New York Times.
 Biography of Innokenty Smoktunovsky

1925 births
1994 deaths
20th-century Russian male actors
People from Tomsk Governorate
Heroes of Socialist Labour
Honored Artists of the RSFSR
People's Artists of the RSFSR
People's Artists of the USSR
Lenin Prize winners
Recipients of the Medal "For Courage" (Russia)
Recipients of the Nika Award
Recipients of the Order of Friendship of Peoples
Recipients of the Order of Lenin
Recipients of the Vasilyev Brothers State Prize of the RSFSR
Audiobook narrators
Male Shakespearean actors
Russian people of Belarusian descent
Russian male film actors
Russian male stage actors
Russian male television actors
Russian male voice actors
Soviet male film actors
Soviet male stage actors
Soviet male television actors
Soviet male voice actors
Soviet military personnel of World War II
Soviet partisans
Spoken word artists
Burials at Novodevichy Cemetery